The Nabeul Bir Challouf Indoor Sports Complex is an indoor sporting arena located in Nabeul, Tunisia, with a capacity of 5,000 spectators. It is the home of the Tunisian basketball club Stade Nabeulien.

Events
The Nabeul Sports Complex was built specifically to host some of the 2005 FIBA Under-19 World Championship for Women matches and also hosted many 2005 World Men's Handball Championship matches. It has since became the home of the Stade Nabeulien Basketball team.

The complex is used for other sports, including volleyball, handball, wrestling, karate, judo and taekwondo and also hosts politics events and concerts.

References

External links
Some photos 

Indoor arenas in Tunisia
Basketball venues in Tunisia